Camajuaní II is a consejo popular ("ward") in Camajuaní, Cuba.  Combined with Camajuani 1 they have a population of 21,700.

Geography 
Camajuani 2 borders Sabana, Luis Arcos Bergnes, La Quinta, Vega de Palma, and Camajuaní 1. Towns in Camajuani II include the western side of the main town of Camajuani, the southern side of El Bosque, Tarafa, and Crucero Tarafa.

References 

Populated places in Villa Clara Province
1988 establishments in North America
Populated places established in 1988
1988 establishments in Cuba